Times Like These is the fourth studio album by American country music singer Buddy Jewell. The album was released on April 26, 2005 by Columbia Records. Two singles were released from the project, "If She Were Any Other Woman" and "So Gone." While the former peaked in the Top 30 of Billboard's Hot Country Songs chart, the latter failed to chart entirely.

Sales of Times Like These failed to meet those of Jewell's debut, and he was dropped by Columbia in September 2005.

Track listing

Personnel
Adapted from liner notes.

 Eddie Bayers - drums, percussion
 Kevin Collier - electric guitar
 J.T. Corenflos - electric guitar
 Stuart Duncan - fiddle, mandolin
 Troy Engle - fiddle
 Shannon Forrest - drums
 Larry Franklin - fiddle
 Paul Franklin - dobro, steel guitar
 Garth Fundis - background vocals
 Vince Gill - background vocals
 Lloyd Green - dobro
 Wes Hightower - background vocals
 John Hobbs - organ, piano
 Buddy Jewell - lead vocals, background vocals
 Rich Lloyd - bass guitar
 Brent Mason - acoustic guitar, electric guitar, nylon string guitar
 Billy Panda - acoustic guitar
 Steve Paxton - piano
 Mickey Raphael - harmonica
 Michael Rhodes - bass guitar
 Dave Ristrim - steel guitar
 Marty Slayton - background vocals
 Kenneth Smith - drums
 Harry Stinson - background vocals
 Bryan Sutton - banjo, acoustic guitar
 Reese Wynans - Fender Rhodes, organ

Chart performance

References

2005 albums
Buddy Jewell albums
Columbia Records albums
Albums produced by Garth Fundis